Pemphixina is a monotypic genus of brachiopods belonging to the family Hemithirididae. The only species is Pemphixina pyxidata.

The species is found in southern part of Indian Ocean.

References

Rhynchonellida
Brachiopod genera
Monotypic brachiopod genera